The 2017 Rio Tennis Classic was a professional tennis tournament played on clay courts. It was the first edition of the tournament which is part of the 2017 ATP Challenger Tour. It took place in Rio de Janeiro, Brazil from 20 to 26 November 2017.

Singles main-draw entrants

Seeds

 1 Rankings are as of 13 November 2017.

Other entrants
The following players received wildcards into the singles main draw:
  Rogério Dutra Silva
  Christian Oliveira
  Pedro Sakamoto
  Thiago Seyboth Wild

The following players received entry from the qualifying draw:
  Romain Arneodo
  Roberto Carballés Baena
  André Ghem
  Fabrício Neis

The following player received entry as a lucky loser:
  Péter Nagy

Champions

Singles

  Carlos Berlocq def.  Jaume Munar 6–4, 2–6, 3–0 ret.

Doubles

  Máximo González /  Fabrício Neis def.  Marcelo Arévalo /  Miguel Ángel Reyes-Varela 5–7, 6–4, [10–4].

References

2017 ATP Challenger Tour
2017
2017 in Brazilian tennis